Gillenbach is a river of Rhineland-Palatinate, Germany. It is a right tributary of the Queich at Hauenstein.

See also
List of rivers of Rhineland-Palatinate

References

Rivers of Rhineland-Palatinate
Rivers of Germany